Leif Bech (c. 1927–2013) was a speedway rider from Denmark.

Speedway career 
Bech was a two times champion of Denmark, winning the Danish Championship in 1952 and 1954. In 1955, he emigrated to Australia and was a blacksmith by trade.

References 

1920s births
2013 deaths
Year of birth uncertain
Danish speedway riders